In molecular biology, the EAL domain is a conserved protein domain. It is found in diverse bacterial signalling proteins. It is named EAL after its conserved residues. The EAL domain may function as a diguanylate phosphodiesterase. The domain contains many conserved acidic residues that could participate in metal binding and might form the phosphodiesterase active site.

References

Protein domains